BC Sliven was a professional basketball club, based in Sliven, Bulgaria. The club played in the NBL during the 2008–09 season. The team replaced BC Balkan in the NBL because of their financial problems.

Basketball teams in Bulgaria